The Korail Class 8500 is a South Korean electric locomotive operated by the Korean national railroad operator Korail.

References

Bibliography

External links
 Korail 8500 profile on Trainspo

Electric locomotives of South Korea
Bo-Bo locomotives
25 kV AC locomotives
Railway locomotives introduced in 2012
Standard gauge locomotives of South Korea